Kamal Desai (10 November 1928–17 June 2011) was an Indian novelist writing in Marathi.

She was born in Yamkan Mardi in the Belgaum district. She studied in Belgaum, going on to complete a master's degree in Marathi at Bombay University. Desai began writing in 1955 and retired to Pune.

She is best known for her 1975 novel Hat Ghalnari Bai (Woman Wearing a Hat).

Selected works 
 Rang (Colours), stories (1962)
 Ratrandin Amha Yuddhacha Prasang (We confront the war day and night), novel (1963)
 Kala Surya (Dark sun), novel (1972)
 Rang-2, stories (1998)

References 

1928 births
Indian women novelists
Indian women short story writers
Marathi-language writers
People from Belagavi district
University of Mumbai alumni
20th-century Indian novelists
Women writers from Karnataka
20th-century Indian short story writers
Novelists from Karnataka
20th-century Indian women writers
2011 deaths